Newton Clark Glacier is an alpine glacier on the southeast slope of Mount Hood in the U.S. state of Oregon. The glacier lies entirely within Mount Hood Wilderness.

Between 1907 and 2004, Newton Clark Glacier lost 32% of its surface area and the glacier terminus retreated  over the same time period.

See also
List of glaciers in the United States

References

Glaciers of Mount Hood
Glaciers of Hood River County, Oregon
Mount Hood National Forest
Glaciers of Oregon